Dinara is a village  near Bhuj of Kutch district of Gujarat, India.

Places of interest
About half a mile to the south of village, the ruins of a white-limestone Jain temple, fifty feet long by eighteen wide, said to be the place where Sadevant and Savalinga, the hero and heroine of a Gujarati romance, used to study.

References

 This article incorporates Public Domain text from 

Villages in Kutch district